According to Jeung San Do, the universe generates and cultivates life through a cyclic process of birth, growth, harvest, and rest (生長殮藏). This is closely related to the fluctuation and interplay of the two polar energies, yin and yang and its cycle appeared in daily, yearly, and cosmically. 129,600 calendar years make up one Cosmic year and it was discovered by Shao Yung.

Daily cycle 
The creative cycle can be seen in the passing of one day. At night, yin is at its strongest. The moon, darkness, stillness, and quietness all have yin nature. Night is a time of rest. When the sun, which has yang nature, rises, it is a time of birth. People tend to follow this flow of energy by sleeping at night and waking up in the morning. As the sun rises, yang becomes stronger and people tend to become more active. The afternoon is a time of growth. Eventually, yang reaches its highest peak, and from that point on, yin starts to regain its influence, and human activity starts to wind down. For many people, the evening is a time of relaxation and entertainment. This is the harvest in which they enjoy what they have worked for. Finally, yin becomes very dominant and things tend to return to the night time state of rest.

Yearly cycle 
This process can also be seen in the cycle of one year. Heat is a manifestation of yang, and when the temperature rises in spring, sprouts break through the surface of the ground, dead yellow grass is replaced with new green grass, and new leaves appear on the trees. Spring is a time of birth. As summer approaches, yang continues to rise as yin diminishes. Things grow more rapidly and vegetation becomes lush. Summer is a time of growth. By the time autumn comes, yin has started to regain its influence. Autumn is a time of harvest when things come to fruition, and during autumn, as yin becomes more and more dominant, things return to the winter state of rest. Year after year this cycle repeats.

Cosmic cycle 

According to Jeung San Do's teachings, the universe follows the cycle of birth-growth-harvest-rest (生長殮藏) or spring-summer-autumn-winter. This cycle, called the Cosmic Year, repeats every 129,600 calendar years, a number calculated by Chinese scholar Shao Yung. At the beginning and end of each cycle, the universe is in a yin state of dormancy called the cosmic winter. On our planet, this manifests as an ice age. As the yang energy regains its influence, the cosmic winter changes to spring and new life and a new human species appear on the earth. We call the current stage of humanity homo sapiens sapiens. The time of cosmic spring and summer is one of growth and diversity during which many cultures and civilizations develop. It is also a time of conflict. Cosmic autumn is a time of returning to oneness, a time in which humanity harvests its diverse experiences and accomplishments to create a global civilization of harmony.

At any stage of the cosmic year, the position of the Earth's axis demonstrates the concurrent relationship between yin and yang. It is generally accepted that in the history of our planet there have been periodic changes in the Earth's poles, magnetism, and orbit.

Sudden change 

What is left to debate is whether these changes occur gradually or suddenly. If we examine changes in nature during a calendric year, it becomes obvious that change occurs both suddenly and gradually. An example of this is the cherry blossom, which blooms in March. Gradually, over the course of a few months buds grow on the cherry tree, but suddenly, within a day or so, all of the flowers bloom at once. Finally, with just one strong wind or a heavy rain all of the blossoms fall.

Cosmic cycles in other traditions 
In anthroposophy, based on teachings by Rudolf Steiner, a cosmic year represents the Platonic year, a period of 25,920 years. This is the time required for the Sun's position at spring equinox to traverse the complete zodiac. So each zodiacal sign covers about 2160 years. The year 747 BCE marked the transition from Taurus to Aries and since 1453, the spring equinoctial sun is in Pisces. This cosmic cycle has a considerable influence on humanity in both physical and spiritual respects. For instance, the Aries period covered the Greek/Roman culture period ranging from the foundation of Rome (753 BCE) to the fall of Byzantium (1453), whereas the Taurus period marked the Egyptian/Chaldaean era. Another example is human breathing rhythm: an average of 18 cycles per minute represents 18 x 60 x 24 = 25,920 cycles per day. The number of daily sleep-wake-cycles of the conscious mind in an average human lifetime of 72 years adds up to the same platonic figure. Shao Yung's cosmic year represents exactly five platonic years (5x25,920=129,600).

See also
 Boeun (Offering Gratitude and Repayment) 報恩
 Dojang Dao center 道場
 Dojeon Sacred text of Jeung San Do 道典
 Gaebyeok
 Haewon (Resolution of Bitterness and Grief) 解怨
 Jeung San Do
 Sangjenim 上帝
 Sangsaeng (Mutual life-giving) 相生
 Tae Eul Ju mantra 太乙呪
 Taemonim 太母
 Wonsibanbon (Returning to the Origin) 原始反本
 Yuga Cycle (Hindu cycle of time)

Jeung San Do